Bill Sowalski (born c. 1930) was a Canadian football player who played for the Ottawa Rough Riders. He won the Grey Cup with them in 1960.

References

1930s births
Ottawa Rough Riders players
Sportspeople from Hamilton, Ontario
Players of Canadian football from Ontario
Living people